The Best of Everything may refer to:

 The Best of Everything (novel), a novel by Rona Jaffe
 The Best of Everything (film), a 1959 romantic drama film, based on the novel
 The Best of Everything (TV series), an American daytime soap opera, based on the film
 "The Best of Everything", a song by Tom Petty and the Heartbreakers from the album Southern Accents
 The Best of Everything (album), a greatest hits album by Tom Petty